David Chillingworth (born 23 June 1951) is an Anglican bishop. He was Bishop of St Andrews, Dunkeld and Dunblane between 2004 and 2017, until his retirement. He was also the Primus of the Scottish Episcopal Church from 2009 to 2016.

Early life and education
Chillingworth was born in Dublin in 1951 but grew up in Northern Ireland. He studied classics at Trinity College, Dublin, and graduated with a Bachelor of Arts (BA) degree in 1973. He then studied theology at Oriel College, Oxford, and graduated from the University of Oxford with a BA degree in 1975. That year, he entered Ripon College Cuddesdon, an Anglican theological college, to undertake one year of training for ordained ministry.

Ordained ministry
Chillingworth was ordained in the Church of Ireland as a deacon in 1976 and as a priest in 1978. His parish ministry was consistently focused on issues of conflict and reconciliation, particularly in relation to sectarianism. He also served as the Church of Ireland Youth Officer from 1979 to 1983. Before moving to Scotland in 2005 he was the rector for 19 years of Seagoe Parish Church in Portadown and Archdeacon of Dromore and from 1995 to 2002 the Dean of Dromore.

Episcopal ministry
On 5 March 2004, Chillingworth was consecrated as a bishop at St Ninian's Cathedral, Perth. He then became the bishop of the Diocese of St Andrews, Dunkeld and Dunblane, making him one of the seven diocesan bishops of the Scottish Episcopal Church.

On 13 June 2009, Chillingworth was elected the Primus of the Scottish Episcopal Church by the other bishops. Although it is not uncommon for the Scottish Episcopal Church to elect bishops from outside the boundaries of Scotland, the choice of Chillingworth was unusual in that he was elected from the Church of Ireland. He had never previously worked in Scotland and had lived most of his life in Northern Ireland.

Personal life
Chillingworth is married to Alison. Together, they have three children: Anna, Simon, and Mark.

References

Living people
1951 births
Christian clergy from Dublin (city)
People from Portadown
Alumni of Oriel College, Oxford
Archdeacons of Dromore
Deans of Dromore
Bishops of Saint Andrews, Dunkeld and Dunblane
Church of Ireland priests
Alumni of Trinity College Dublin
Primuses of the Scottish Episcopal Church